Voters from Nebraska Territory elected delegates to the United States Congress from January 5, 1855, until statehood was achieved in 1867

Delegates from Nebraska Territory

References 

 

Territory
Former congressional districts of the United States